Preston Montford, or Preston Montford Hall, is a historic house  west of Shrewsbury in England that is used as a field studies centre by Field Studies Council. It lies within easy reach of the meres and mosses landscape of north Shropshire, as well as the varied landscapes of the Shropshire Hills Area of Outstanding Natural Beauty. It is a grade II* listed building, indicating a particularly important building of more than special interest.

Opened as a field studies centre in 1957, Preston Montford is visited by students of biology and geography, and by school groups. Specialist interest groups regularly visit the centre. The Open University ran its 1-week undergraduate residential course SXR216 Environmental science in the field at the centre from 2003-2011. It has developed partnerships with Manchester Metropolitan University and the Botanical Society of Britain and Ireland to tackle the decline in skills of field taxonomy through the MSc in 'Biological Recording and Ecological Surveying'.

See also
Listed buildings in Bicton, Shrewsbury

External links

Preston Montford Field Centre

References 

Shrewsbury and Atcham
Grade II* listed buildings in Shropshire
Field studies centres in the United Kingdom